Distant Land is a 2010 television film directed by Niklas Holmgren and Anders Hazelius. The screen play is also written by Niklas Holmgren and Anders Hazelius. The film takes place on Fårö, an island north of Gotland in the Baltic Sea, in Sweden. Principal photography took place on Fårö and in a studio in Fårösund, Sweden. Fårö is the island where several of Ingmar Bergmans most noted motion pictures was filmed. The film was shot during August, 2008. The film premiered in 2010 in Sweden.

Plot 
The film picture two women's sojourn at Fårö. Elisabeth is fleeing from her life in Stockholm because of a family tragedy, to take care of a cabin village. She finds a 13-year-old boy on the beach whom she hides in her house. The actress Cecilia is with a film crew on the island. She mismanage her work and jeopardize her part. She meets 17-year-old Christoffer who turns everything upside down. On the island both women are confronted with their lives and have to face difficult choices.

Cast 
Jonatan Blode
Liv Enqvist
Joakim Jurell
Adam Lundgren
Joel Lützow
Franciska Löfgren
Ulla-Britt Norrman
Camilla Nyberg Waller
Peter Schildt
Emma Swenninger
Annika Wallin Öberg

References

External links 
 

2010 television films
2010 films
Swedish television films
2010s Swedish-language films
2010s Swedish films